Elliott Harris Levitas (December 26, 1930 – December 16, 2022) was an American politician and lawyer from Georgia. He was a former U.S. Representative from Georgia's 4th congressional district, serving five consecutive terms from 1975 to 1985. He was the first Jewish congressman elected in Georgia.

Early life
Born in Atlanta, Georgia, Levitas graduated in 1948 from Henry W. Grady High School there. He attended Emory University in Atlanta, where he was a member of the secret honor society D.V.S. In 1956, he earned a Juris Doctor from the Emory University School of Law. A Rhodes scholar, he received a Master of Laws degree in 1958 from University of Oxford in England. He conducted additional study in law at the University of Michigan from 1954 to 1955. He was admitted to the Georgia bar in 1955 and commenced practice in Atlanta.

Levitas was active in the local Jewish community in Atlanta and with the Anti-Defamation League. He was in the United States Air Force from 1955 to 1958.

Political career 
Levitas was a delegate to the 1964 Democratic National Convention in Atlantic City, New Jersey, which nominated the Lyndon B. Johnson/Hubert H. Humphrey ticket, the first Democratic slate to lose the electoral votes of Georgia since the Reconstruction era.

State legislature 
Levitas was elected to the Georgia House of Representatives in 1964 and served from 1965 to 1974. Early in his first term, he gained notoriety for voting in support of civil rights activist Julian Bond, who was in a contested battle to be assume his seat following his election to the legislature. Levitas was one of only five white legislators to vote in support of seating Bond.

In his second term in the state House, he was one of thirty Democrats who voted for the Republican Howard Callaway, rather than the Democratic nominee, Lester Maddox, a segregationist from Atlanta, in the disputed 1966 gubernatorial race. The legislature, however, chose Maddox to resolve the deadlock though Callaway had led the balloting in the general election by some three thousand votes. In all, Levitas served five terms in the legislature.

Tenure in Congress 
Levitas was elected as a Democrat to the Ninety-fourth and to the four succeeding Congresses (January 3, 1975 – January 3, 1985). Levitas represented a district dominated by DeKalb County, northeast of Atlanta. For four terms prior to his election, Benjamin B. Blackburn, a Republican, represented the area. Elected in the Watergate class of 1974, he quickly established himself as a champion of causes related to the environment, eventually rising to the chairmanship of the committee with oversight on such matters. He was an unsuccessful candidate for reelection to the Ninety-ninth Congress in 1984, losing to Republican Pat Swindall amid Ronald Reagan carrying the district in a landslide.

Later life 
After Congress, Levitas was a partner with Kilpatrick Townsend & Stockton. His most notable case, Cobell v. Norton, involved a lawsuit of the Blackfeet tribe against the U.S. Government over the amount owed to the tribe for land that had been taken and used for various industrial purposes. The successful $3.4 billion verdict was at the time the largest ever class-action award against the U.S. government.

Death 
Levitas died on December 16, 2022, at the age of 91. He is buried at Arlington Memorial Park near Atlanta. Each year, his alma mater, Emory University, issues an award in Levitas’s honor to the outstanding graduating senior political science major.

See also 
 List of Jewish members of the United States Congress

References

External links
Kilpatrick Townsend profile
 
 
Stuart A. Rose Manuscript, Archives, and Rare Book Library, Emory University: Elliott Levitas papers, 1965-1985

1930 births
2022 deaths
Democratic Party members of the Georgia House of Representatives
Emory University alumni
Emory University School of Law alumni
American Rhodes Scholars
United States Air Force airmen
Jewish American military personnel
Military personnel from Georgia (U.S. state)
Georgia (U.S. state) lawyers
Democratic Party members of the United States House of Representatives from Georgia (U.S. state)
University of Michigan Law School alumni
Jewish members of the United States House of Representatives
21st-century American Jews
Members of Congress who became lobbyists